A list of films produced in the Soviet Union in 1966 (see 1966 in film).

1966

References

External links
 Soviet films of 1966 at the Internet Movie Database

1966
Lists of 1966 films by country or language
Films